Lakemont is a white table grape, part of the "Three Sisters" group, consisting of Himrod, Lakemont, and Interlaken. All are named after towns in the Finger Lakes region of North America. Lakemont ripens later than the other two "sisters", but it is sweeter and has bigger fruit, and has a slightly different flavor. Some nurseries claim that Lakemont is more productive than both Himrod and Interlaken.

References 

Table grape varieties
Hybrid grape varieties